Cydantidae or Kydantidai was a deme in ancient Attica, originally of the phyle of Aegeis, after 224/3 BCE of the phyle of Ptolemais, sending one or two delegates to the Athenian Boule.

This deme, along with that of Ionidae, venerated the kolokratai; these two demoi were the only ones, as far as we know, to venerate deities together.

Its site is located near Mendeli Monastery.

People
Nicias, Athenian politician and general

References

Populated places in ancient Attica
Former populated places in Greece
Demoi